Great Lake Swimmers is a Canadian folk rock band from Wainfleet, Ontario, and currently based in Toronto.

The current touring line-up includes Tony Dekker on lead vocals, acoustic guitar and harmonica, Erik Arnesen on banjo, electric guitar and harmonium, Joshua Van Tassel on drums, Bret Higgins on upright bass and Miranda Mulholland on violin and backing vocals. Past members included Julie Fader on backing vocals, Sandro Perri on guitar, and Greg Millson and Colin Huebert on drums.

The band's style has been compared to Red House Painters, Nick Drake, Iron & Wine and Neil Young, as well as Will Oldham (Bonnie "Prince" Billy) and Sufjan Stevens. Dekker has cited influences including Gram Parsons and Hank Williams.

History
The band released two albums, Great Lake Swimmers in 2003 and Bodies and Minds in 2005, on the independent label (weewerk) before signing to the larger Nettwerk in 2007.

The band released its third full-length album, Ongiara, on March 27, 2007 in Canada and in May for the rest of the world. Although signing to Nettwerk early in 2007, Great Lake Swimmers continue to be managed by (weewerk). In September 2007, (weewerk) released a limited edition vinyl version of Ongiara. It was available in Australia through native indie label Speak N Spell.

Their fourth album, Lost Channels, was released on March 31, 2009. It was shortlisted for the 2009 Polaris Music Prize, and was nominated for a Juno Award, in the category of Roots & Traditional Album of the Year – Group, and a Canadian Folk Music Award.

In 2009 Great Lake Swimmers took part in an interactive documentary series called City Sonic.  The series, which featured 20 Toronto artists, had Tony Dekker talk about his daily underground commute along Toronto’s subway system. In 2011, Dekker participated in the documentary series National Parks Project, visiting Cape Breton Highlands National Park in Nova Scotia with filmmaker Keith Behrman and musicians Daniela Gesundheit and Old Man Luedecke.

The band's fifth studio album, New Wild Everywhere, was released on April 3, 2012. The band also composed an instrumental soundtrack for photographer Ian Coristine's One in a Thousand, an e-book of photography from the Thousand Islands region of Ontario, also released in April 2012.

Dekker released a solo album, Prayer of the Woods, in October 2013. The album includes eight original songs as well as covers of Gordon Lightfoot's "Carefree Highway" and Human Sexual Response's "Land of the Glass Pinecones". In 2014 he followed up with Sings 10 Years of Zunior, an album of covers of other Canadian artists — including Old Man Luedecke, Chad VanGaalen, Christine Fellows, Ohbijou, Rae Spoon, Matt Mays, Martin Tielli, Jennifer Castle and Cadence Weapon — released to mark the 10th anniversary of Canadian web music store Zunior.

The sixth studio album by the full band, A Forest of Arms, was released on April 21, 2015. In 2017 they followed up with the Christmas-themed EP They Don't Make Them Like That Anymore.

In February 2018, the band released the single "Falling Apart"/"The Talking Wind", as an advance preview of the forthcoming album The Waves, the Wake.

Their eighth album, Uncertain Country, is slated for release April 28, 2023.

Discography

Studio albums
 Great Lake Swimmers (weewerk, 2003)
 Bodies and Minds (weewerk, 2005)
 Ongiara (Nettwerk, 2007)
 Lost Channels (Nettwerk, 2009)
 New Wild Everywhere (Nettwerk, 2012)
 A Forest of Arms (Nettwerk, 2015)
 The Waves, the Wake (Nettwerk, 2018)
 Uncertain Country (2023)

Acoustic albums
 The Waves, the Wake (Acoustic) (Nettwerk, 2019)

Cover albums
 When Last We Shook Hands: Cover Songs, Vol. 1 (2020)

EPs
 Hands in Dirty Ground (weewerk, 2006)
 Swimming Away (2016)
 They Don't Make Them Like That Anymore (2017)
 Side Effects (2018)

Live albums
 Live at the Church of the Redeemer (Nettwerk, 2007)
 The Legion Sessions (Nettwerk, 2009)
 Live in Ottawa at the 27 Club, October 3, 2019 (2020)
 Live at the Redeemer 2007 (Weewerk, 2021)

Singles

Compilations
 See You on the Moon! (2005): "See You on the Moon!"
 The Sound the Hare Heard (2006): "Where in the World Are You"
 Borrowed Tunes II: A Tribute to Neil Young (2007): "Don't Cry No Tears"
 Peace on Earth (2007): "Gonna Make It Thru This Year"
 Northern Songs: Canada's Best and Brightest (2008): "Your Rocky Spine"
 (weewerk) is 6! (2008): "Song for the Angels (Miracle Version)", "Gonna Make It Thru This Year". (Dekker also appears as a guest musician on tracks by Audiotransparent, Julie Fader and United Steel Workers of Montreal.)
 Friends in Bellwoods II (2009): "Send Me a Letter"
 Introducing Townes Van Zandt via the Great Unknown (2009): "Our Mother the Mountain"
 A Country Blues Christmas: The 2010 Zunior Holiday Album (2010): "When the Snow Starts to Fall"
 Paint it Black: An Alt-Country Tribute to the Rolling Stones (2011): "Before They Make Me Run"
 Have Not Been the Same - Vol. 1: Too Cool to Live, Too Smart to Die (2011): "What Was Going Through My Head" (The Grapes of Wrath cover)
 My Name Is Mathias (2014): "The Things That People Make (Part 3)"

Soundtrack
 This is not like home (Silver Road, 2007)
 Your Rocky Spine (Weeds, 3x06 Grasshopper, 2007)
 Passenger Song (Numb3rs, 5x08 Thirty-Six Hours, 2008)
 Song Sung Blue (original film score, weewerk, 2008)
 There Is a Light (The Light of Family Burnam, 2008)
 I Could Be Nothing (Personal Effects), 2010)
 Leave It Behind (Personal Effects), 2010)
 Imaginary Bars (Out of Place: a Portrait of Surfing in Cleveland, Ohio, 2010)

Other
In 2006, the band released a "digital box set" on Zunior, consisting of their first two albums, the limited edition Hands in Dirty Ground EP, several digital tour photos and the video for their song "To Leave It Behind" on a 512 MB USB flash drive.

In 2008, Dekker appeared on Jenny Omnichord's album Charlotte or Otis: Duets for Children, Their Parents and Other People Too, performing a duet vocal on the song "Do You Know Karate".

In 2009 the band released a limited double 7" vinyl split single with the Dutch band Audiotransparent. This release includes a cover of the Elvis Presley classic "Don't Be Cruel" and the original song "Send Me a Letter". Dekker and Arnesen also appear on the Audiotransparent song "You Are a Movie".

In 2010, the band contributed four tracks to the online music community Swim Drink Fish Music, including live versions of their songs "Your Rocky Spine", "I Could Be Nothing" and "Everything Is Moving So Fast" and a previously unreleased track, "Ballad of a Fisherman's Wife".

The songs “I Became Awake” and “Various Stages” are heard in the 2010 independent Canadian horror film The Corridor.

The song "Moving Pictures Silent Films" was featured in the August 8, 2011 episode of Warehouse 13, entitled "3...2...1..."

In 2012 the band contributed the Christmas song "Hang a String of Lights" to Paste magazine's annual online Holiday Sampler music collection.

Awards

Canadian Indie Awards

|-
| 2010 || Great Lake Swimmers || Favourite Folk/Roots Artist/Group ||

References

External links
 Great Lake Swimmers official website
 Great Lake Swimmers on (weewerk) Records

Musical groups established in 2003
Musical groups from the Regional Municipality of Niagara
Musical groups from Toronto
Canadian folk rock groups
2003 establishments in Ontario
Canadian indie folk groups
Nettwerk Music Group artists